The following is a list of applications for building installation programs, organized by platform support.

Cross-platform

Linux

Windows

macOS

AmigaOS

See also
 List of software package management systems

References

 
Installation software